The third season of Australian drama television series Prisoner (commonly known as Prisoner: Cell Block H) premiered on Network Ten on 4 February 1981. It consists of 81 episodes and concluded on 11 November 1981.

The season is notable for the conclusion to the tunnel escape storyline which ended the previous season; the departure of Vera Bennett ("Vinegar Tits") when she accepts the position of governor of Barnhurst; the kidnapping of Erica Davidson; the arrival of new prisoners Sandy Edwards, Kate Peterson and former inmate and top dog of H Block – Marie Winter; Bea Smith's amnesia, and later, her mysterious illness which sees her step down as top dog, only to be replaced by Sandy Edwards.

Cast

Main

 Patsy King as Governor Erica Davidson
 Fiona Spence as Vera Bennett
 Val Lehman as Bea Smith
 Elspeth Ballantyne as Meg Morris
 Colette Mann as Doreen Burns
 Sheila Florance as Lizzy Birdsworth
 Gerard Maguire as Jim Fletcher
 Betty Bobbitt as Judy Bryant
 Judith McGrath as Colleen Powell

Special guest
 Mary Ward as Jeanette "Mum" Brooks

Central supporting

 Amanda Muggleton as Chrissie Latham
 Serge Lazareff as David Andrews
 Olivia Hamnett as Kate Petersen
 Louise Le Nay as Sandy Edwards
 Kate Sheil as Janet Conway
 Wayne Jarratt as Steve Falkner
 Maggie Millar as Marie Winter

Recurring

 Julia Blake as Evelyn Randall
 Mary Charleston as Linda Golman 
 Jane Clifton as Margo Gaffney
 Tommy Dysart as Jock Stewart
 Susannah Fowle as Lori Young
 Caroline Gillmer as Helen Smart
 Brian Hannan as Terry Harrison
 Anthony Hawkins as Bob Morris
 Leila Hayes as Jeannie Baxter
 Edward Hepple as Sid Humphrey 
 Bethany Lee as Andrea Hennessy
 Alan Hopgood as Albert "Wally" Wallace
 Sue Jones as Kathy Hall
 Fay Kelton as Alison Page
 Nina Landis as Michelle Parks
 Michael Long as Mick O'Brien
 Tracey Mann as Georgie Baxter
 Ned Manning as Nick Clarke
 Tom Oliver as Ken Pearce
 Candy Raymond as Sandra Hamilton
 Wynn Roberts as Stuart Gillespie
 Gael Andrews as Sister Johnson
 Paul Bertram as Mr. Williamson
 Ernie Bourne as Peter Hope
 John Bowman as Henry
 Aileen Britton as Florence Marne
 Christine Calcutt as Mrs. O'Reagan
 Paul Colombani as Martin Richards
 Deborah Coulls as Micki Wallace
 Peter Cummins as Hartman 
 Belinda Davey as Hazel Kent
 Peter De Salis as Mr. Martin
 Stefan Dennis as Peter Richards
 Rod Densley as Gerry
 Sue Devine as Tracey Morris
 Laurie Dobson as Paul Tranter 
 Beverly Dunn as Mrs. Mitchell
 Marion Edwards as Mrs. Reid 
 Maureen Edwards as Officer Bailey
 Jennifer Finch as Susan Page
 Simon Finch as Chris Page 
 Stuart Finch as Don Page
 John Frawley as James Marne

 Bill Garner as Det. Sgt. Ross
 Jon Geros as Mike the Bike
 Terry Gill as Det. Insp. Grace
 Vince Gill as Wayne Bradshaw
 Paul Glen as John Fitzwater
 Hannah Govan as Mrs. Dyson
 Kirsty Grant as Samantha 
 Gary Gray as Dr. Marsden
 Diane Greentree as Sister Franklin
 Liddy Holloway as Sister Hainer
 Denzil Howson as Mr. Muirhead
 Tim Hughes as Bazza
 Amanda Irving as Janet
 Brian James as Dr. Kennedy
 Barbara Jungwirth as Lorna Young
 Paul Karo as Det. Sgt. Rouse
 Jackie Kelleher as Gwen Hill
 Bruce Kerr as Gorgon Humphrey
 Debra Lawrence as Sally Dean
 Alix Longman as Janie Chapman
 Dina Mann as Debbie Pearce
 Kerry McGuire as Arna Johannsen
 Joan Millar as Brenda Latham
 Chris Milne as Tony Morton
 David Nettheim as Mr. Carter
 Gerda Nicolson as Mrs. Roberts
 Helen Noonan as Wendy Scott
 Reylene Pearce as Phyllis Hunt
 Anne Phelan as Myra Desmond
 Valma Pratt as Matron Swartz
 Peter Regan as Dr. Granger
 Ian Smith as Ted Douglas
 Jon Sidney as Colin Lester
 Trudy Simms as Dinah Walford
 Jentah Sobott as Heather "Mouse" Trapp
 Kate Turner as Ricky
 Joy Westmore as Joyce Barry
 Bryon Williams as Dr. Weissman
 Myrtle Woods as Amelia Humber
 John Wregg as Mr. Golman
 Paul Young as Captain Barton
 William Zappa as Del Latham

Episodes

Accolades
 Logie Award for Best Lead Actress in a series – Val Lehman (1982)
 Logie Award for Most Popular Actress – Val Lehman (1982)
 Logie Award for Most Popular Drama Series – Prisoner (1982)

Home media
The following is a list of DVD sets which contain individual episodes from season three or the complete season as a whole.

Notes

References

1981 in Australian television